Luca Luzardi (born 18 February 1970) is an Italian former professional footballer who played as a defender.

Club career
Luzardi was born in Manerbio. After playing for several Italian clubs, such as Brescia, Prato, Lazio, and Napoli in 1996, Luzardi joined Tottenham Hotspur on a six-week trial from Brescia, but was only allowed to play in friendly matches. Gerry Francis, the Spurs manager at the time, ultimately decided not to meet his £600,000 valuation, and Luzardi returned to Italy.

International career
At international level, Luzardi was a member of the Italy national under-21 football team that won the 1992 UEFA European Under-21 Football Championship; he also represented Italy at the 1992 Summer Olympics.

Honours

International
Italy U-21
 1992 UEFA European Under-21 Football Championship winner.

References

1970 births
Living people
Association football defenders
Italian footballers
Italy under-21 international footballers
Serie A players
Serie B players
Footballers at the 1992 Summer Olympics
Olympic footballers of Italy
Brescia Calcio players
A.C. Prato players
S.S. Lazio players
S.S.C. Napoli players
Ascoli Calcio 1898 F.C. players
A.C. Reggiana 1919 players
Pol. Monterotondo Lupa players